Emmanuel Segura Maldonado (born February 17, 1993, in San Luis Potosí) is a Mexican professional footballer who currently plays for Cafetaleros de Chiapas.

References

1993 births
Living people
Tigres UANL footballers
Tampico Madero F.C. footballers
Alebrijes de Oaxaca players
FC Juárez footballers
Dorados de Sinaloa footballers
Cimarrones de Sonora players
Cafetaleros de Chiapas footballers
Ascenso MX players
Liga Premier de México players
Tercera División de México players
Footballers from San Luis Potosí
People from San Luis Potosí City
Association football midfielders
Mexican footballers